Rotterdam Noord is a railway station in the city of Rotterdam in the Netherlands, located on the Utrecht–Rotterdam railway. It sits at the border between the two Rotterdam boroughs Noord and Hillegersberg-Schiebroek.

History
In 1899, the railway station Hillegersberg was opened on the new connecting line (Ceintuurbaan) between the railway from Rotterdam Delftsche Poort to Leiden, and the railway from Rotterdam Maasstation to Utrecht. In 1953 the railway from Rotterdam to Utrecht was rerouted to the new Rotterdam Centraal railway station through Hillegersberg. A new station building was constructed, and the station was renamed Rotterdam Noord. Rotterdam Noord is designed by architect Sybold van Ravesteyn who has also designed the stations Rotterdam Centraal, Eindhoven, and many other railway stations and buildings in the Netherlands. The station was opened on 4 October 1953.

The building
The platform that leads to Utrecht is connected to a building, where there used to be an NS office that sold tickets. When this office disappeared and the tickets could only be bought at a ticket machine, the building was closed down. Since a few years back the building is used for an art-exposition.

Train services
Rotterdam Noord is a station for local trains (Stoptrein and Sprinter in Dutch).

The following services currently call at Rotterdam Noord.
2x per hour local service (sprinter) Uitgeest - Amsterdam - Woerden - Rotterdam
2x per hour local service (sprinter) Rotterdam - Gouda Goverwelle (Peak hours only)

Tram and bus services
Rotterdam Noord is a stop for the following Rotterdam tram and bus lines on the RET network.

At Night, Rotterdam Noord is connected by the Bob bus, operated by RET. Bob is a drink or drive campaign.

References

External links
NS website 
Dutch Public Transport journey planner 

Noord
Railway stations opened in 1953